Glenn Malcolm Anderson (February 21, 1913 – December 13, 1994) was an American politician. He was the 37th Lieutenant Governor of California and later represented Southern Los Angeles County (including Carson, San Pedro, and Long Beach) in the U.S. House of Representatives. He was a member of the Democratic Party.

Early life and education
Anderson was born on February 21, 1913, in Hawthorne, California. He received a Bachelor of Arts from University of California, Los Angeles in 1936. He worked as a real estate developer and served in the United States Army as an infantry sergeant during World War II.

Career

California Legislature 
Anderson was mayor of Hawthorne from 1940 to 1943 and a member of the California State Assembly for the 46th district from 1943 to 1951. He served as Lieutenant Governor of California from 1959 to 1967, a tenure most notable for his actions relating to the 1965 Watts riots. With Governor Pat Brown vacationing in Greece when the riots broke out in August, 1965, Anderson served as acting governor. When Los Angeles officials urgently requested state support to quell the riots, Anderson waited five hours before granting approval. The subsequent controversy dogged Anderson for the remainder of his career and was a major factor in his 1966 defeat at the hands of Republican Robert Finch.

U.S. House
Anderson was first elected to the 91st Congress in 1968 and served 12 terms from 1969 to 1993. As a former real estate developer, he successfully sought a seat on the Committee on Public Works and Transportation, of which he would become chair in 1988. His House colleagues claimed that Anderson’s abilities slipped dramatically in the late 1980s because of his advancing age. State Democratic leaders went so far as to suggest reapportionment in 1991 that would carve up Anderson’s harbor area district. He was removed as Committee Chairman after only 33 months.

He decided not to run for re-election in 1992.

Personal life
Anderson underwent multiple heart bypass surgery in 1988. He died on December 13, 1994, at San Pedro Peninsula Hospital Pavilion. The cause of death was complications of Alzheimer’s disease. He was 81.

He is interred in Green Hills Memorial Park, Rancho Palos Verdes, California.

The Los Angeles Harbor ship channel is named in his honor, and the Interstate 105 in South Los Angeles is named the "Glenn M. Anderson Freeway”.

References

External links
 
 
 
 Join California - Glenn M. Anderson

1913 births
1994 deaths
Lieutenant Governors of California
Mayors of places in California
People from Hawthorne, California
Democratic Party members of the California State Assembly
Democratic Party members of the United States House of Representatives from California
University of California, Los Angeles alumni
20th-century American politicians